The 2009–10 Coupe Gambardella was the 55th edition of the French cup competition reserved for male under-19 football players. The competition is organized by the French Football Federation. The final was contested on 1 May 2010 at the Stade de France and served as a curtain raiser for the 2009–10 Coupe de France final. The defending champions were Montpellier, who defeated Nantes 2–0 in the 2008–09 edition of the competition. The current champions are Metz who won the competition by defeating Sochaux 4–3 on penalties in the final after the match ended 1–1 in 90 minutes.

Calendar
On 17 August 2009, the French Football Federation announced the calendar for the Coupe Gambardella.

First round
The draw for the first round of Coupe Gambardella was conducted on 26 November 2009 at the headquarters of the French Football Federation, in Paris by French referee Bertrand Layec. The matches were contested on 13 December 2009. The postponed matches were played on 3 January 2010.

Second round
The draw for the second round of the Coupe Gambardella was conducted on 17 December 2009 at the headquarters of the French Football Federation, in Paris by France national under-19 football team coach Francis Smerecki. The matches were contested on 9 January 2010. The postponed matches were played on 16 and 17 January and the matches that were postponed on those days were played on 20 January with the final match of the round being played on 24 January.

Round of 64
The draw for the Round of 64 of the Coupe Gambardella was conducted on 14 January 2010 at the headquarters of the French Football Federation, in Paris by the president of the Ligue du Football Amateur Fernand Duchaussoy and Jean-Pierre Dubédat, a member of the board of directors of the Ligue du Football Amateur. The matches will be played on 31 January 2010.

Round of 32
The draw for the Round of 32 of the Coupe Gambardella was conducted on 4 February 2010 at the headquarters of Crédit Agricole, who sponsor the competition, in Paris by the France national football team manager Raymond Domenech and a host of members of the Ligue du Football Amateur, including the president Fernand Duchaussoy. The matches were played on 21 February.

Round of 16
The draw for the Round of 16 of the Coupe Gambardella was conducted on 25 February 2010 at the Ligue de Paris-Île-de-France headquarters, in Paris, by France national under-18 football team manager Philippe Bergeroo and Jean-Claude Giuntini, a member of the Ligue du Football Amateur. The matches were played on 14 March.

Quarterfinals
The draw for the Round of 16 of the Coupe Gambardella was conducted on 25 February 2010 at the headquarters of Crédit Agricole, who sponsor the competition, in Paris by French parachuting champion Nicolas Ratier. The matches were played on 4 April.

Semi-finals
The draw for the Round of 16 of the Coupe Gambardella was conducted on 25 February 2010 at the headquarters of Crédit Agricole, who sponsor the competition, in Paris by French parachuting champion Nicolas Ratier. The matches will be played on 18 April.

Final

References

External links
 Official site 

2009–10 domestic association football cups
2009–10 in French football
Coupe Gambardella